Virginia's 11th House of Delegates district elects one of 100 seats in the Virginia House of Delegates, the lower house of the state's bicameral legislature. District 11 represents part of Fairfax County. The district is currently represented by Democrat Kaye Kory.

Electoral history
In the 1982, a general election was held for all Virginia House of Delegates seats following redistricting (typically Virginia's state-level legislative elections are held on odd-number years). That year, Democrat Nora Anderson Squyres narrowly defeated Republican Gwendalyn F. Cody in the contest to represent the 38th district, winning by just 180 votes; however, another general election was held the following year and Cody defeated Squyres. Cody then served a two-year term before being defeated by Democrat Leslie Byrne in 1985. Byrne represented the seat for the next six years until her election to the U.S. House of Representatives in 1992 (becoming the first woman ever elected to represent Virginia in the House). Democrat Robert D. Hull won the December 1992 special election to fill the vacated seat. He was subsequently reelected seven times (consecutively), serving until he faced a primary challenge from Democrat Kaye Kory, who had previously served on the Fairfax County School Board. Kory won the primary by a narrow margin and was elected to the seat in 2009, winning the general with just under 60% of the vote. Since then, Kory has been re-elected four times (2011, 2013, 2015 and 2017), generally earning about 75% of the vote.

In 2019, Kory faces her first primary challenge, from Andres Jimenez.

District officeholders

References

Virginia House of Delegates districts
Government in Fairfax County, Virginia